Kaumal Nanayakkara (born 17 November 1999) is a Sri Lankan cricketer. He made his Twenty20 debut on 12 January 2020, for Panadura Sports Club in the 2019–20 SLC Twenty20 Tournament. He made his List A debut on 1 April 2021, for Panadura Sports Club in the 2020–21 Major Clubs Limited Over Tournament.

References

External links
 

1999 births
Living people
Sri Lankan cricketers
Panadura Sports Club cricketers
Place of birth missing (living people)